Michel Venne (born in 1960) is a Canadian journalist, author and intellectual. He is a columnist for the Montreal newspaper Le Devoir. He is founder and director of the Institut du Nouveau Monde. Venne is a vocal advocate of Quebec independence  and of progressive, social democratic politics.

Venne studied communications at the Université du Québec à Montréal (UQÀM) and  political science at Université Laval, in Quebec City. At Le Devoir, he has  been parliamentary correspondent at the National Assembly of Quebec, editor, and news director. He is editor of L'annuaire du Québec, an  exhaustive annual publication on Quebec affairs, sold in bookstores.

on June 23, 2021, Venne was found guilty of sexual assault against Quebec media personality Léa Clermont-Dion when she was a minor. This verdict was appealed.

Bibliography

Author 
Vie privée et démocratie à l'ère de l'informatique (1994)
Ces fascinantes inforoutes (1995)
Les Porteurs de liberté (2001)
Souverainistes, que faire? (2002)

Director 
Penser la nation québécoise (2000)
La Révolution génétique (2001)
Santé : Une thérapie de choc (2001)
Justice, prospérité et démocratie. L'avenir du modèle québécois (2003)

Awards 
Judith-Jasmin Award (1993)
Michener Grant (1997)

Family 
Venne is also a husband and a father.

See also 
Politics of Quebec

References

Biography of Michel Venne at the Institut du Nouveau Monde website

External links
Article archive (1996 to 2004) at Vigile.net

Writers from Quebec
Le Devoir people
Université du Québec à Montréal alumni
Canadian non-fiction writers in French
1960 births
Living people
Quebec sovereigntists
Canadian male non-fiction writers
People convicted of sexual assault